The Municipality of Šmarješke Toplice is a municipality in the traditional region of Lower Carniola in southeastern Slovenia. The seat of the municipality is the town of Šmarješke Toplice. The municipality is now included in the Southeast Slovenia Statistical Region.

Settlements
In addition to the municipal seat of Šmarješke Toplice, the municipality also includes the following settlements:

 Bela Cerkev
 Brezovica
 Čelevec
 Dol pri Šmarjeti
 Dolenje Kronovo
 Draga
 Družinska Vas
 Gorenja Vas pri Šmarjeti
 Gradenje
 Grič pri Klevevžu
 Hrib
 Koglo
 Mala Strmica
 Orešje
 Radovlja
 Sela
 Sela pri Zburah
 Šmarjeta
 Strelac
 Vinica pri Šmarjeti
 Vinji Vrh
 Zbure
 Žaloviče

References

External links

 Šmarješke Toplice municipal site
 Municipality of Šmarješke Toplice at Geopedia

Smarjeske Toplice